Paintings on masonite is a series of 27 abstract paintings made by Joan Miró using the type of proprietary hardboard known as masonite, just after the Spanish Civil War started on 18 July 1936. These works break with his earlier phase which was known as his wild paintings period. This was a label established to describe the work done during the two years preceding the Civil War, between 1934 and 1936.

Description and reviews 
Rosa Maria Malet Ph.D, President of the Fundació Joan Miró in Barcelona (1980-2017), compares masonites with the wild paintings immediately preceding, painted on copper and other materials:

The Museum of Modern Art in New York also emphasizes the violence of the technique:

The works were painted in Mont-roig del Camp and Barcelona. Shortly after he finished these paintings, the artist left the country and went back to Paris, in the fall of 1936, where he would stay for four years.

The series

See also
 The Love Embrace of the Universe, the Earth (Mexico), Myself, Diego, and Señor Xolotl, a painting on masonite by Frida Kahlo.

References

Further reading

External links 
 "Joan Miró: Painting and Anti-Painting 1927-1937. The Museum of Modern Art New York (November 2, 2008 to January 12, 2009)", Michele Leight, The City Review, Manhattan, 2008.
 "MoMA Presents the First Major Museum Exhibition to Focus on the Transformative Decade of Joan Miró's Work between 1927 and 1937"

1936 paintings
Paintings by Joan Miró